The Lindenwood Lady Lions women represented Lindenwood University in CHA women's ice hockey during the 2018-19 NCAA Division I women's ice hockey season. The team struggled with their record, with nine newcomers, and a team made up of very young players.

Offseason

Recruiting

Transfers

Standings

Roster

2018–19 Lady Lions

Schedule

|-
!colspan=12 style=" "| Regular Season

|-
!colspan=12 style=" "|CHA Tournament

Awards and honors
Sophomore Sierra Burt was named to the All-CHA Second Team. Burt was a power play specialist with four multi-point games.

Forward Jada Burke, Defender Taylor Kirwan and Goaltender Sophie Wolf were all named to the All-Rookie Team.

References

Lindenwood
Lindenwood Lions women's ice hockey seasons
Lindenwood
Lindenwood